The Soviet Union (USSR) competed at the 1964 Summer Olympics in Tokyo, Japan. 317 competitors, 254 men and 63 women, took part in 154 events in 19 sports.

Medalists
The USSR finished second in the final medal rankings, with 30 gold and 96 total medals.

Gold
 Larisa Latynina — Artistic gymnastics, women's floor exercise
 Boris Shakhlin — Artistic gymnastics, men's horizontal bar
 Larisa Latynina, Polina Astakhova, Tamara Manina, Elena Volchetskaya, Tamara Zamotailova, Lyudmila Gromova — Artistic gymnastics, women's team competition
 Polina Astakhova — Artistic gymnastics, women's uneven bars
 Tamara Press — Athletics, women's discus throw
 Romuald Klim — Athletics, men's hammer throw
 Valery Brumel — Athletics, men's high jump
 Irina Press — Athletics, women's pentathlon
 Tamara Press — Athletics, women's shot put
 Stanislav Stepashkin — Boxing, men's featherweight
 Boris Lagutin — Boxing, men's light-middleweight
 Valery Popenchenko — Boxing, men's 71–75 kg
 Andrei Khimich, Stepan Oshchepkov — Canoeing, men's C-2 1000 m
 Lyudmila Khvedosyuk-Pinaeva — Canoeing, women's K-1 500 m
 Nikolai Chuzhikov, Anatoli Grishin, Vyacheslav Ionov, Vladimir Morozov — Canoeing, K-4 1000 m
 Grigori Kriss — Fencing, men's épée individual
 Viktor Zhdanovich, Yuri Sharov, Yuri Sisikin, German Sveshnikov, Mark Midler — Fencing, men's foil team
 Boris Melnikov, Nugzar Asatiani, Mark Rakita, Yakov Rylsky, Umar Mavlikhanov — Fencing, men's sabre team
 Albert Mokeev, Igor Novikov, Viktor Mineev — Modern pentathlon, men's team competition
 Oleg Tyurin, Boris Dubrovskiy — Rowing, men's double sculls
 Vyacheslav Ivanov — Rowing, men's single sculls
 Galina Prozumenschikova-Stepanova — Swimming, women's 200 m breaststroke
 Yuri Chesnokov, Yuri Vengerovsky, Eduard Sibiryakov, Dmitry Voskoboinikov, Vazha Katcharava, Stanislav Lyugailo, Vitali Kovalenko, Yuri Poyarkov, Ivan Bugaenkov, Nikolai Burobin, Valery Kalachikhin, Georgi Mondzolevsky — Volleyball, men's team
 Leonid Zhabotinsky — Weightlifting, men's heavyweight
 Aleksei Vakhonin — Weightlifting, men's bantamweight
 Rudolf Plyukfelder — Weightlifting, men's light-heavyweight
 Vladimir Golovanov — Weightlifting, men's middle-heavyweight
 Alexander Ivanytsky — Wrestling, men's freestyle heavyweight
 Alexander Medved — Wrestling, men's freestyle light-heavyweight
 Anatoli Kolesov — Wrestling, men's Greco-Roman welterweight

Silver
 Tamara Manina — Artistic gymnastics, women's balance beam
 Viktor Lisitsky — Artistic gymnastics, men's floor exercise
 Polina Astakhova — Artistic gymnastics, women's floor exercise
 Yuri Titov — Artistic gymnastics, men's horizontal bar
 Boris Shakhlin — Artistic gymnastics, men's individual all-round
 Viktor Lisitsky — Artistic gymnastics, men's individual all-round
 Larisa Latynina — Artistic gymnastics, women's individual all-round
 Boris Shakhlin, Yuri Titov, Viktor Lisitsky, Yury Tsapenko, Sergei Diomidov, Viktor Leontyev — Artistic gymnastics, men's team competition
 Viktor Lisitsky — Artistic gymnastics, men's vault
 Larisa Latynina — Artistic gymnastics, women's vault
 Rein Aun — Athletics, men's decathlon
 Oleg Fyodoseyev — Athletics, men's triple jump
 Valdis Muizhniek, Nikolai Bagley, Armenak Alachachian, Aleksandr Travin, Vyacheslav Khrynin, Jānis Krūmiņš, Levan Moseshvili, Yuri Korneev, Aleksandr Petrov, Gennadi Volnov, Jaak Lipso, Yuris Kalnyns — Basketball, men's team
 Velikton Barannikov — Boxing, men's lightweight
 Yevgeny Frolov — Boxing, men's light-welterweight
 Rikardas Tamulis — Boxing, men's welterweight
 Aleksei Kiselyov — Boxing, men's light-heavyweight
 Imant Bodnieks, Viktor Logunov — Cycling Track, men's 2000 m tandem
 Lyudmila Shishova, Valentina Prudskova, Valentina Rastvorova, Tatyana Petrenko-Samusenko, Galina Gorokhova — Fencing, women's foil team
 Igor Novikov — Modern pentathlon, men's individual competition
 Shota Kveliashvili — Shooting, men's 300 m free rifle 3 positions
 Pavel Senichev — Shooting, men's trap
 Georgi Prokopenko — Swimming, men's 200 m breaststroke
 Antonina Ryzhova, Astra Biltauer, Ninel Lukanina, Lyudmila Buldakova, Nelli Abramova, Tamara Tikhonina, Valentina Kamenek-Vinogradova, Inna Ryskal, Marita Katusheva, Tatyana Roshchina, Valentina Mishak, Lyudmila Gureeva — Volleyball, women's team
 Yury Vlasov — Weightlifting, men's heavyweight
 Vladimir Kaplunov — Weightlifting, men's lightweight
 Viktor Kurentsov — Weightlifting, men's middleweight
 Guliko Sagaradze — Wrestling, men's freestyle welterweight
 Anatoli Roshchin — Wrestling, men's Greco-Roman super heavyweight
 Vladlen Trostyansky — Wrestling, men's Greco-Roman bantamweight
 Roman Rurua — Wrestling, men's Greco-Roman featherweight

Bronze
 Larisa Latynina — Artistic gymnastics, women's balance beam
 Polina Astakhova — Artistic gymnastics, women's individual all-round
 Yury Tsapenko — Artistic gymnastics, men's pommel horse
 Boris Shakhlin — Artistic gymnastics, men's rings
 Larisa Latynina — Artistic gymnastics, women's uneven bars
 Anatoly Mikhailov — Athletics, men's 110 m hurdles
 Vladimir Golubnichy — Athletics, men's 20 km walk
 Ivan Belyayev — Athletics, men's 3000 m steeplechase
 Taisiya Chenchik — Athletics, women's high jump
 Yanis Lusis — Athletics, men's javelin throw
 Yelena Gorchakova — Athletics, women's javelin throw
 Igor Ter-Ovanesyan — Athletics, men's long jump
 Tatyana Shchelkanova — Athletics, women's long jump
 Galina Bystrova — Athletics, women's pentathlon
 Galina Zybina — Athletics, women's shot put
 Viktor Kravchenko — Athletics, men's triple jump
 Vadim Emelyanov — Boxing, men's heavyweight
 Stanislav Sorokin — Boxing, men's flyweight
 Yevgeny Penyaev — Canoeing, men's C-1 1000 m
 Galina Alekseeva — Diving, women's 10 m platform
 Sergei Filatov, his horse Absent — Equestrian, individual mixed
 Sergei Filatov, Absent, Ivan Kizimov, Ikhor, Ivan Kalita, Moar — Equestrian, team mixed
 Guram Kostava — Fencing, men's épée individual
 Umar Mavlikhanov — Fencing, men's sabre individual
 Anzor Kiknadze — Judo, men's heavyweight
 Parnaos Chikviladze — Judo, men's heavyweight
 Oleg Stepanov — Judo, men's lightweight
 Aron Bogolyubov — Judo, men's lightweight
 Albert Mokeev — Modern pentathlon, men's individual competition
 Svetlana Babanina — Swimming, women's 200 m breaststroke
 Tatyana Savelyeva, Svetlana Babanina, Tatyana Devyatova, Natalya Ustinova — women's 4 × 100 m medley relay
 Igor Grabovsky, Vladimir Kuznetsov, Boris Grishin, Boris Popov, Nikolai Kalashnikov, Zenon Bortkevich, Nikolai Kuznetsov, Vladimir Semyonov, Viktor Ageev, Leonid Osipov, Eduard Egorov — Water polo, men's team
 Aydin Ibrahimov — Wrestling, men's freestyle bantamweight
 Nodar Khokhashvili — Wrestling, men's freestyle featherweight
 David Gvanteladze — Wrestling, men's Greco-Roman lightweight

Athletics

Basketball

Boxing

Canoeing

Cycling

Twelve cyclists represented the Soviet Union in 1964.

 Individual road race
 Gaynan Saydkhuzhin
 Anatoly Olizarenko
 Yury Melikhov
 Aleksei Petrov

 Team time trial
 Yury Melikhov
 Anatoly Olizarenko
 Aleksei Petrov
 Gaynan Saydkhuzhin

 Sprint
 Valery Khitrov
 Omar Pkhak'adze

 1000 m time trial
 Viktor Logunov

 Tandem
 Imants Bodnieks
 Viktor Logunov

 Individual pursuit
 Stanislav Moskvin

 Team pursuit
 Dzintars Lācis
 Leonid Kolumbet
 Stanislav Moskvin
 Sergey Tereshchenkov

Diving

Equestrian

Fencing

20 fencers, 15 men and 5 women, represented the Soviet Union in 1964.

 Men's foil
 Viktor Zhdanovich
 German Sveshnikov
 Mark Midler

 Men's team foil
 Viktor Zhdanovich, Yury Sisikin, Mark Midler, German Sveshnikov, Yury Sharov

 Men's épée
 Grigory Kriss
 Guram Kostava
 Bruno Habārovs

 Men's team épée
 Bruno Habārovs, Guram Kostava, Yury Smolyakov, Grigory Kriss, Aleksey Nikanchikov

 Men's sabre
 Umyar Mavlikhanov
 Yakov Rylsky
 Mark Rakita

 Men's team sabre
 Umyar Mavlikhanov, Mark Rakita, Yakov Rylsky, Boris Melnikov, Nugzar Asatiani

 Women's foil
 Galina Gorokhova
 Valentina Rastvorova
 Valentina Prudskova

 Women's team foil
 Valentina Rastvorova, Tatyana Petrenko-Samusenko, Lyudmila Shishova, Valentina Prudskova, Galina Gorokhova

Gymnastics

Judo

Modern pentathlon

Three male pentathlete represented the Soviet Union in 1964. The team won gold, Albert Mokeyev won an individual bronze and Igor Novikov won an individual silver.

Individual
 Igor Novikov
 Albert Mokeyev
 Viktor Mineyev

Team
 Igor Novikov
 Albert Mokeyev
 Viktor Mineyev

Rowing

The Soviet Union had 26 male rowers participate in seven rowing events in 1964.

 Men's single sculls – 1st place ( gold medal)
 Vyacheslav Ivanov (Вячеслав Иванов)

 Men's double sculls – 1st place ( gold medal)
 Oleg Tyurin (Олег Тюрин)
 Boris Dubrovskiy (Борис Дубровский)

 Men's coxless pair
 Oleg Golovanov (Олег Голованов)
 Valentin Boreyko (Валентин Борейко)

 Men's coxed pair – 4th place
 Nikolay Safronov (Николай Сафронов)
 Leonid Rakovshchik (Леонид Раковщик)
 Igor Rudakov (Игорь Рудаков)

 Men's coxless four – 7th place
 Celestinas Jucys (Целестинас Юцис)
 Eugenijus Levickas (Еугениус Левицкас)
 Jonas Motiejūnas (Йонас Матеюнас)
 Anatoliy Sass (Анатолий Сасс)

 Men's coxed four – 5th place
 Anatoliy Tkachuk (Anatoly Tkachuk, Анатолий Ткачук)
 Vitaly Kurdchenko (Виталий Курдченко)
 Boris Kuzmin (Борис Кузьмин)
 Vladimir Yevseyev (Владимир Евсеев)
 Anatoly Luzgin (Анатолий Лузгин)

 Men's eight – 5th place
 Juozas Jagelavičius (Yozas Yagelavichyus, Йозас Ягелавичюс)
 Yury Suslin (Юрий Суслин)
 Petras Karla (Петрас Карла)
 Vytautas Briedis (Vitautas Briedis, Витаутас Бриедис)
 Volodymyr Sterlik (Vladimir Sterlik, Владимир Стерлик)
 Zigmas Jukna (Zigmas Yukna, Зигмас Юкна)
 Antanas Bagdonavičius (Antanas Bagdonavichyus, Антанас Багдонавичюс)
 Ričardas Vaitkevičius (Richardas Vaytkyavichyus, Ричардас Вайткявичус)
 Yury Lorentsson (Юрий Лоренцсон)

Sailing

Shooting

Ten shooters represented the Soviet Union in 1964. Shota Kveliashvili won a silver in the 300 m rifle, three positions and Pāvels Seničevs won a silver in the trap event.

25 m pistol
 Igor Bakalov
 Aleksandr Zabelin

50 m pistol
 Albert Udachin
 Yevgeny Rasskazov

300 m rifle, three positions
 Shota Kveliashvili
 Aleksandrs Gerasimjonoks

50 m rifle, three positions
 Viktor Shamburkin
 Vladimir Chuyan

50 m rifle, prone
 Vladimir Chuyan
 Viktor Shamburkin

Trap
 Pāvels Seničevs
 Sergey Kalinin

Swimming

Volleyball

 Men's team competition
 Round robin
 Defeated Romania (3–0)
 Defeated Netherlands (3–0)
 Defeated South Korea (3–0)
 Defeated Hungary (3–0)
 Defeated Czechoslovakia (3–2)
 Lost to Japan (1–3)
 Defeated United States (3–0)
 Defeated Bulgaria (3–0)
 Defeated Brazil (3–0) →  gold medal
 Team roster
 Ivan Bugaenkov
 Nikolai Burobin
 Yuri Chesnokov
 Vascha Kacharava
 Valery Kalatschikhin
 Vitaly Kovalenko
 Stanislav Ljugailo
 Georgy Mondzolevsky
 Yuri Poryarkov
 Eduard Sibiryakov
 Yuri Vengorovsky
 Dimitri Voskoboynikov

 Women's team competition
 Round robin
 Defeated Romania (3–0)
 Defeated South Korea (3–0)
 Defeated Poland (3–0)
 Defeated United States (3–0)
 Lost to Japan (0–3) →  silver medal
 Team roster
 Nelly Abramova
 Astra Biltauere
 Lyudmila Buldakova
 Lyudmila Gureyeva
 Valentina Kamenek
 Marita Katusheva
 Ninel Lukanina
 Valentina Mishak
 Tatyana Roschina
 Inna Ryskal
 Nina Rishkova
 Tamara Tikhonina

Water polo

Weightlifting

Wrestling

References

External links
 Official Olympic Reports
 International Olympic Committee results database

Nations at the 1964 Summer Olympics
1964
Summer Olympics